The Cotillion Ballroom is a concert venue in Wichita, Kansas, United States.  It is located between Maize Road and 119th Street West on the north side of Kellogg (U.S. 54) in west Wichita.

The Cotillion is a special events facility that hosts concerts, roller derby, dances, comedians and stage shows featuring nationally known artists and performers. This special events facility is available to rent for concerts, dances, banquets, corporate events, wedding receptions, trade shows and private parties.

History
During the late 1950s, Wichita needed a place to go for all kinds of entertainment including concerts, dances and rental space for private functions. Built in 1960, The Cotillion is a  building with a maximum concert capacity of 2,000 people.

In 2018, Richard and Catherine Leslie sold the Cotillion Ballroom to Adam Hartke, Alex Thomas, and some partners.

Events

References

External links
 
 The Cotillion on 360Wichita.com
 The Official Cotillion MySpace page
 The Official Cotillion Facebook page
 The Official Cotillion Twitter page

Indoor arenas in Kansas
Sports venues in Wichita, Kansas
Music venues in Kansas